James Thomas Gibbons Hayes,  (11 February 1889 – 28 March 1980) was an American, Roman Catholic, Jesuit archbishop and missionary who served as the first  Archbishop of Cagayan de Oro in the Philippines.

Background

Hayes was born on 11 February 1889 in New York City, New York, United States. He attended the St. Francis Xavier College in New York City and Woodstock College in Maryland. He also studied in Tronchiennes, Belgium.

He started a career as a teacher, teaching at Regis High School in New York City. From 1918 to 1919, he taught the Classics at the Boston College in Chestnut Hill, Massachusetts. He then served as Dean of Discipline at Fordham University from 1923 to 1925.

Ministry

In 1907, Hayes entered the Society of Jesus. On 29 June 1921, he was ordained priest. He moved to the Philippines to do missionary work in 1926. A year after, he already started serving as the Superior of the Jesuits in Mindanao. By 1930, he became Superior of the Jesuits in the Philippines, a position he held until 1933.

On 20 January 1933, the new diocese of Cagayan de Oro was created by Pope Pius XI through the Papal bull "Ad maius religionis". Hayes was appointed as the first bishop of the new diocese and ordained as bishop on 16 March 1933 and 18 June 1933 respectively.

On 29 June 1951, Pope Pius XII, through the Papal bull "Quo Phillipina Republica", elevated the Diocese of Cagayan de Oro to an archdiocese and appointed Hayes as the first Archbishop.

He retired on 13 October 1970 and was succeeded by Patrick Cronin. Consequently, he became Archbishop Emeritus of Cagayan de Oro and titular bishop of Gabii. On 2 December 1970, he resigned as Titular bishop of Gabii. He died on 28 March 1980.

Legacy

In 1928, Hayes founded the San Agustin Parochial School, the predecessor of the present Lourdes College in Cagayan de Oro.

He then founded boys school Ateneo de Cagayan, now Xavier University, and became its first President.

In 1956, in order to respond to the growing number of priests in the diocese, Hayes founded the San Jose de Mindanao Seminary.

In recognition of Archbishop Hayes' role in the history of Cagayan de Oro, the road traversing from the north wing of the Cagayan de Oro City Hall to the St. John Vianney Theological Seminary was named after him.

References

Clergy from New York City
American emigrants to the Philippines
20th-century Roman Catholic archbishops in the Philippines
Roman Catholic archbishops of Cagayan de Oro
Participants in the Second Vatican Council
1889 births
1980 deaths
20th-century American Jesuits
Jesuit provincial superiors